Tewkesbury Rural District was from 1894 to 1935 a rural district in the southwestern part of the Midlands in England. It had the unusual feature of including territory from the two neighbouring administrative counties of Gloucestershire and Worcestershire until boundary changes in 1933 placed the entire district in Gloucestershire.

Formation
The rural district was formed by the Local Government Act 1894 as successor to the Tewkesbury Rural Sanitary District. A directly elected rural district council (RDC) replaced the rural sanitary authority, which consisted of the poor law guardians for the area. The district did not include the town of Tewkesbury which was a separate municipal borough.

Parishes
The district comprised the following civil parishes:

Abolition
The district was abolished in 1935, and its area was redistributed. Most passed to Cheltenham Rural District; four parishes (Chaceley, Forthampton, Hasfield and Tirley) were transferred to Gloucester Rural District, while  was included within the municipal borough of Tewkesbury.

References
Notes

Bibliography

 
 

Districts of England created by the Local Government Act 1894
History of Gloucestershire
History of Worcestershire
Rural districts of England